Willie Mitchell (born August 28, 1940) is a former professional football cornerback who played eight professional seasons 1964-1971.  After winning the League Championship with the American Football League's Kansas City Chiefs in 1966, he started for them in the first AFL-NFL World Championship Game, and was on the Chiefs team that won the 1969 AFL Championship and then defeated the NFL's heavily favored Minnesota Vikings in the fourth and final AFL-NFL World Championship Game.

See also
Other American Football League players

External links
Photo of Mitchell from the 1967 AFL Championship game

1940 births
Living people
American football cornerbacks
Tennessee State Tigers football players
Kansas City Chiefs players
Houston Oilers players
Players of American football from San Antonio
American Football League players